Statistics of Swedish football Division 3 for the 1951–52 season.

League standings

Norra 1951–52

Östra 1951–52

Västra 1951–52

Södra 1951–52

Footnotes

References 

Swedish Football Division 3 seasons
3
Swed